Michael Gregory Campbell OSA (born 2 October 1941) is an Augustinian friar and biblical scholar. He is a prelate of the Roman Catholic Church, who served as the Bishop of Lancaster in England from 2009 to 2018.

Life
Campbell was born in Larne, County Antrim, in Northern Ireland, in 1941 and entered the Order of St. Augustine around 1960. He was educated at University College, Dublin (BA) and King's College London (MA Biblical Studies). He professed solemn religious vows as a full and permanent member of the Order on 17 September 1966. He was ordained as a Catholic priest at the chapel of Austin Friars School in the city of Carlisle on 16 September 1971.

In 2008, Campbell was appointed by Pope Benedict XVI as the coadjutor bishop of the Roman Catholic Diocese of Lancaster. He was consecrated by Patrick O'Donoghue, Bishop of Lancaster. He succeeded O'Donoghue on 1 May 2009.

On his 75th birthday in October 2016, in accordance with the Catholic Church's guidelines, Campbell submitted his resignation to the Vatican which was accepted by Pope Francis. Campbell has stated he will stay in office until a successor is appointed. In February 2018, it was announced that he would be succeeded as Bishop of Lancaster by Paul Swarbrick.

Works
 A Shoot from the Stock of Jesse (2006)
 Mary, Woman of Prayer (2007)
 A Time to Seek the Lord (2008)
 The Greatest of These is Love (2008)
 The Way of the Cross with Saint Paul (2009)
 You will be My Witnesses (2011)

References

Morecambe Today
Michael Campbell's Blog

External links

St.Paul's

1941 births
Living people
People from Larne
Augustinian friars
Alumni of King's College London
Alumni of University College Dublin
British biblical scholars
Roman Catholic biblical scholars
Roman Catholic bishops of Lancaster
21st-century Roman Catholic bishops in England
Augustinian bishops